Khilok (Khyoolgo; , Khilgo) is a town and the administrative center of Khiloksky District in Zabaykalsky Krai, Russia, located on the Khilok River, a right-hand tributary of the Selenga,  west of Chita, the administrative center of the krai. Population:

History
Cossack expeditions had explored the region since the middle of the 17th century; however, the large populations of Buryats and Evenks deterred the Cossacks from founding a permanent settlement. Peter the Great granted wide autonomy to the local princes, and the region was not colonized by Russians until the end of the 19th century when the construction of the Trans-Siberian Railway began.

The modern settlement of Khilok was founded in 1895 as a works base around the newly constructed railway station at the Khilok River, the river's name deriving from an Evenk word meaning whetstone. The local section of the Trans-Siberian Railway opened in 1900. Khilok was granted town status in 1951.

Administrative and municipal status
Within the framework of administrative divisions, Khilok serves as the administrative center of Khiloksky District, to which it is directly subordinated. As a municipal division, the town of Khilok, together with two rural localities, is incorporated within Khiloksky Municipal District as Khilokskoye Urban Settlement.

Climate

Transportation
The town is a station on the Trans-Siberian Railway.

References

Notes

Sources

External links

Official website of Khilok 
Khilok Business Directory 

Cities and towns in Zabaykalsky Krai
1895 establishments in the Russian Empire